Bryan Blanshard (born 28 January 1966) is a Canadian badminton player. He competed in two events at the 1992 Summer Olympics.

References

1966 births
Living people
Canadian male badminton players
Olympic badminton players of Canada
Badminton players at the 1992 Summer Olympics
Sportspeople from Toronto
Commonwealth Games medallists in badminton
Badminton players at the 1990 Commonwealth Games
Commonwealth Games silver medallists for Canada
Commonwealth Games bronze medallists for Canada
Medallists at the 1990 Commonwealth Games